Stenen ("made of stone") can refer to:

 Stenen, Saskatchewan, a village in Canada
 De Stenen Tafel, a restaurant in the Netherlands
 Ole Stenen, a Norwegian Nordic skier
 Den vita stenen, a Swedish children's book
 Års-stenen, the Aars stone, a runestone in Denmark